Christie Ann Hefner (born November 8, 1952) is an American businesswoman. She was chairman and CEO of Playboy Enterprises from 1988 to 2009, and is the daughter of Playboy magazine founder Hugh Hefner.

Early life
Hefner was born in Chicago, Illinois. She is the daughter of Mildred (Williams) and Hugh Hefner.  Her parents had separated by the time she was five.  When her mother remarried, she moved to Wilmette, Illinois.  There she graduated from New Trier High School.  She attended the National Music Camp at Interlochen, Michigan, during the summers from 1964 to 1969.

She graduated summa cum laude from Brandeis University with a bachelor's degree in English and American literature in 1974.  She was elected to Phi Beta Kappa in her junior year.

Career
After college, she free-lanced for the Boston Phoenix for a year, writing movie reviews. Thereafter, she moved back to Chicago and started working at Playboy.

In 1982, she became president of Playboy Enterprises, and was made chairman of the board and CEO in 1988.  She was the longest serving female CEO of a publicly traded company.  She extended its magazine franchise overseas, to 25 localized foreign editions and also developed the company's profitable pay television business — the first time a magazine successfully leveraged its brand into a television network.  The company also acquired adult-oriented businesses such as Spice Network and ClubJenna. Continuing the company's electronic expansion, in 1994 Christie led the company onto the Internet with the launch of Playboy.com, the first national magazine to launch a web site, and built an international, profitable, multi-revenue stream business including premium content, e-commerce, advertising and gaming, both online and mobile.  She also built a highly profitable direct marketing, catalog and e-commerce business in film and music through both acquisition and organic growth.  And, she greatly expanded the leveraging of the Playboy brand via licensing.  In her last year as CEO, Playboy generated close to $1 billion in global retail sales, 80% of the sales to women.  When she left over 40% of her executives were women.  For three years, she was named to Fortune list of "Most Powerful Women".

In 2008, she released a memo to employees about her efforts to streamline the company's operations, including eliminating its DVD division and laying off staff.

On December 8, 2008, she announced her plans to step down as CEO of Playboy. Hefner said that the election of Barack Obama as the next U.S. president had inspired her to give more time to charitable work, and that the decision to step down was her own. "Just as this country is embracing change in the form of new leadership, I have decided that now is the time to make changes in my own life as well", she said. She stepped down from her position at Playboy on January 30, 2009.

In May 2011, Hefner was named executive chairman of Canyon Ranch Enterprises, a resort company that operates six premier spa destinations and an online website providing health and wellness advice.

As of 2015, Hefner was chairman of the board of Hatchbeauty Brands and served on the board of the D.C. based Center for American Progress Action Fund, a progressive public policy think tank.  Christie also serves on the advisory boards of the R.D. Offutt company, an international, multi-billion dollar family owned agricultural conglomerate and Edge Beauty, the world's leading direct-to-consumer company in creating, designing, manufacturing and marketing unique, culturally relevant niche fragrance brands.

Philanthropy
Hefner created the Hugh M. Hefner First Amendment Award in honor of her father, and has  helped to raise $30 million to build the CORE Center in Chicago, the first outpatient facility in the Midwest for people with AIDS.

Personal life
Hefner married former Illinois state senator William A. Marovitz, a real estate developer and attorney, in 1995. They divorced in 2013 and have no children. Marovitz was sued by the U.S. Securities and Exchange Commission for allegedly using inside information to trade illegally in shares of Playboy. In 2011, he settled out of court for $168,352.

She lives in Chicago and has one brother, David, a computer systems analyst. She also has two half-brothers, Cooper and Marston, from her father's marriage to Kimberley Conrad.

References

Bibliography
Reed, Cheryl, L. (2004). "Career built on guts, family ties -- and skin". Chicago Sun-Times. Archived from the original on May 11, 2004.
 Watts, Steven (2008). Mr. Playboy: Hugh Hefner and the American Dream. Hoboken: John Wiley & Sons.

External links
 
 
https://web.archive.org/web/20110904061834/http://articles.chicagotribune.com/2011-08-04/business/ct-biz-0804-marovitz-playboy-20110804_1_playboy-stock-hefner-and-playboy-playboy-enterprises
Christie Hefner Honored with 2018 Daniel L. Goodwin Watchdog Award on YouTube
Business Strategist, Political Activist on The Chicago Network
Former Playboy CEO Christie Hefner on Fake News on YouTube

1952 births
Living people
Adult magazine publishers (people)
American socialites
Brandeis University alumni
New Trier High School alumni
Businesspeople from Chicago
People from Wilmette, Illinois
Playboy people
Free speech activists
HIV/AIDS activists
American women chief executives
American publishing chief executives
Hefner family